VRSA may refer to:
 Vancomycin-resistant Staphylococcus aureus, a strain of the bacterium Staphylococcus aureus.
 Vila Real de Santo António Municipality, a city and municipality in the Algarve, Portugal.